Rhopalovalva exartemana is a species of moth of the family Tortricidae. It is found in China (Heilongjiang), Korea, Japan and Russia.

References

Moths described in 1901
Eucosmini